Leonardo Fontanesi (born 20 February 1996) is an Italian professional footballer who plays as a centre back.

Club career
Fontanesi is a youth exponent from Sassuolo. He made his Serie A debut on 2 May 2015 against Palermo. He played the first 84 minutes of a 0–0 home draw before being substituted for Cesare Natali.

He signed a five-year contract with Sassuolo on 1 July 2015. On 22 January 2016, Fontanesi was signed by A.C. Cesena on a temporary deal.

In July 2016 Fontanesi returned to Sassuolo. He was assigned number 21 shirt.

On 31 August 2016, Fontanesi was signed by Brescia on a temporary deal, with an option to buy. There, he played only six games during 2016–17 Serie B season.

On 12 July 2017, after returning to Sassuolo, he was signed by Gubbio.

On 13 July 2018, Sassuolo loaned him to Serie C club Pontedera.

References

External links
 

Italian footballers
1996 births
People from Correggio, Emilia-Romagna
Footballers from Emilia-Romagna
Living people
U.S. Sassuolo Calcio players
A.C. Cesena players
Brescia Calcio players
A.S. Gubbio 1910 players
U.S. Città di Pontedera players
Association football defenders
Serie A players
Serie B players
Serie C players
Sportspeople from the Province of Reggio Emilia